Cassina S.p. A. is an Italian manufacturing company specialised in the creation of high-end designer furniture.

Origins

The "Amedeo Cassina" company was created by the brothers Cesare and Umberto Cassina in 1927 in Meda, Brianza, (Northern Italy). After the war, Cassina continued to expand in size and fame, with products which covered a broad range of furniture including: chairs, armchairs, tables, sofas and beds.

History
The company's transformation was bolstered further by commissions for cruise ships, top end hotels and restaurants which accounted for a great part of the company's activity right up to the mid-sixties and beyond.

In 1964 the "Cassina I Maestri" (Cassina Masters) Collection was born, with the acquisition of the rights to products designed by Le Corbusier, Pierre Jeanneret and Charlotte Perriand, the most important names of 20th century design. These included the LC1, LC2, and LC3 armchairs, and the LC4 chaise longue. Today Cassina is the exclusive worldwide licensee of the Le Corbusier designs.

The "Cassina I Maestri" collection was widened in 1968 with the acquisition from Bauhaus-Archiv in Berlin of reproduction rights to some of the Bauhaus objects and in 1971 the designs of Gerrit Rietveld, Frank Lloyd Wright, and of Charles Rennie Mackintosh in 1972. The Masters collection continued with the re-issue in 1983 of furniture by Erik Gunner Asplund, the acquisition from the Frank Lloyd Wright Foundation of rights of reproduction (1986) of furniture by Frank Lloyd Wright, including the Barrel chair (1937), and, finally, in 2004 furniture by Charlotte Perriand.

The 1972, the New York MoMA exhibition, "Italy: the New Domestic Landscape" curated by Emilio Ambasz was co-sponsored Cassina. In 2005 Cassina was purchased by the Poltrona Frau Group.

See also 

List of Italian companies

References

External links

 Cassina S.p.A. home page
 Cassina USA
 Cassina: A Profile in Design Excellence

Italian brands
Design companies of Italy
Furniture companies of Italy
Manufacturing companies based in Milan
Industrial design firms
Manufacturing companies established in 1927
Italian companies established in 1927
Province of Monza and Brianza
Design companies established in 1927